Buckbee is a surname. Notable people with the surname include: 

 Bill Buckbee, American politician
 John T. Buckbee (1871–1936), American politician

See also
 Buckbee, Wisconsin
 Buckby (surname)

Surnames of North American origin